Eusfield John (born 9 September 1952) is a Dominican cricketer. He played in three first-class and two List A matches for the Windward Islands in 1976/77.

See also
 List of Windward Islands first-class cricketers

References

External links
 

1952 births
Living people
Dominica cricketers
Windward Islands cricketers